Cowrie or cowry is the common name for a group of small to large sea snails, marine gastropod mollusks in the family Cypraeidae, the cowries.

The term porcelain derives from the old Italian term for the cowrie shell (porcellana) due to their similar appearance. Shells of certain species have historically been used as currency in several parts of the world, as well as being used, in the past and present, very extensively in jewelry, and for other decorative and ceremonial purposes.

The cowrie was the shell most widely used worldwide as shell money. It is most abundant in the Indian Ocean, and was collected in the Maldive Islands, in Sri Lanka, along the Indian Malabar coast, in Borneo and on other East Indian islands, in Maluku in the Pacific, and in various parts of the African coast from Ras Hafun to Mozambique. Cowrie shell money was important in the trade networks of Africa, South Asia, and East Asia.

In the United States and Mexico, cowrie species inhabit the waters off Central California to Baja California (the chestnut cowrie is the only cowrie species native to the eastern Pacific Ocean off the coast of the United States; further south, off the coast of Mexico, Central America and Peru, Little Deer Cowrie habitat can be found; and further into the Pacific from Central America, the Pacific habitat range of Money Cowrie can be reached) as well as the waters south of the Southeastern United States.

Some species in the family Ovulidae are also often referred to as cowries. In the British Isles the local Trivia species (family Triviidae, species Trivia monacha and Trivia arctica) are sometimes called cowries. The Ovulidae and the Triviidae are other families within Cypraeoidea, the superfamily of cowries and their close relatives.

Etymology
The word cowrie comes from Kiswahili Kauri (meaning ceramic/porcelain), Hindi कौडि (kaudi), from Tamil கவடி ("kavadi"), which has its origins in Sanskrit कपर्द (kaparda).

Shell description 

The shells of cowries are usually smooth and shiny and more or less egg-shaped. The round side of the shell is called the Dorsal Face, whereas the flat under side is called the Ventral Face, which shows a long, narrow, slit-like opening (aperture), which is often toothed at the edges. The narrower end of the egg-shaped cowrie shell is the anterior end, and the broader end of the shell is called the posterior. The spire of the shell is not visible in the adult shell of most species, but is visible in juveniles, which have a different shape from the adults.

Nearly all cowries have a porcelain-like shine, with some exceptions such as Hawaii's granulated cowrie, Nucleolaria granulata. Many have colorful patterns. Lengths range from 5 mm for some species up to 19 cm for the Atlantic deer cowrie, Macrocypraea cervus.

Human use

Monetary use
Cowrie shells, especially Monetaria moneta, were used for centuries as currency by native Africans. In his book Marriage and Morals, Bertrand Russell attributed the use of cowrie shells as currency in ancient Egypt to the similarity between shape of the shell and that of female genitalia. After the 1500s, however, the shell's use as currency became even more common. Western nations, chiefly through the slave trade, introduced huge numbers of Maldivian cowries in Africa. The Ghanaian cedi was named after cowrie shells. Starting over three thousand years ago, cowrie shells, or copies of the shells, were used as Chinese currency. They were also used as means of exchange in India.

The Classical Chinese character for money (貝) originated as a stylized drawing of a Maldivian cowrie shell. Words and characters concerning money, property or wealth usually have this as a radical. Before the Spring and Autumn period the cowrie was used as a type of trade token awarding access to a feudal lord's resources to a worthy vassal.

Ritual use
The Ojibwe aboriginal people in North America use cowrie shells which are called sacred Miigis Shells or whiteshells in Midewiwin ceremonies, and the Whiteshell Provincial Park in Manitoba, Canada is named after this type of shell. There is some debate about how the Ojibway traded for or found these shells, so far inland and so far north, very distant from the natural habitat. Oral stories and birch bark scrolls seem to indicate that the shells were found in the ground, or washed up on the shores of lakes or rivers. Finding the cowrie shells so far inland could indicate the previous use of them by an earlier tribe or group in the area, who may have obtained them through an extensive trade network in the ancient past. 

In Eastern India, particularly in West Bengal, it is given as a token price for the ferry ride of the departed soul to cross the river "Boitaroni".Cowries are used during cremation. Cowries are also used in the worship of Goddess Laxmi.

In Brazil, as a result of the Atlantic slave trade from Africa, cowrie shells (called búzios) are also used to consult the Orixás divinities and hear their replies.

Cowrie shells were among the devices used for divination by the Kaniyar Panicker astrologers of Kerala, India.

In certain parts of Africa, cowries were prized charms, and they were said to be associated with fecundity, sexual pleasure and good luck.

Jewelry
Cowrie shells are also worn as jewelry or otherwise used as ornaments or charms. In Mende culture, cowrie shells are viewed as symbols of womanhood, fertility, birth and wealth. Its underside is supposed, by one modern ethnographic author, to represent a vulva or an eye.

On the Fiji Islands, a shell of the golden cowrie or bulikula, Cypraea aurantium, was drilled at the ends and worn on a string around the neck by chieftains as a badge of rank. The women of Tuvalu use cowrie and other shells in traditional handicrafts.

Games and gambling
Cowrie shells are sometimes used in a way similar to dice, e.g., in board games like Pachisi, Ashta Chamma or in divination (cf. Ifá and the annual customs of Dahomey of Benin). A number of shells (6 or 7 in Pachisi) are thrown, with those landing aperture upwards indicating the actual number rolled.

In Nepal cowries are used for a gambling game, where 16 pieces of cowries are tossed by four different bettors (and sub-bettors under them). This game is usually played at homes and in public during the Hindu festival of Tihar or Deepawali. In the same festival these shells are also worshiped as a symbol of Goddess Lakshmi and wealth.

Other
Large cowrie shells such as that of a Cypraea tigris have been used in Europe in the recent past as a darning egg over which sock heels were stretched. The cowrie's smooth surface allows the needle to be positioned under the cloth more easily. 

In the 1940s and 1950s, small cowry shells were used as a teaching aid in infant schools e.g counting, adding, subtracting.

See also 
Money cowry
Shell money
Whiteshell

References

Further reading 
 Felix Lorenz and Alex Hubert, A Guide to Worldwide Cowries; Conchbooks (1999)

External links 
 Cowrie Genomic Database Project
 Genus Cypraea on Animal Diversity Web
 cowry.org – studying Hawaii's cowries
 Beautifulcowries – a gallery of images of cowries
 
 

Cypraeidae
Mollusc common names